Syllepte sulphureotincta is a moth in the family Crambidae. It was described by George Hampson in 1918. It is endemic to Mozambique.

The forewings are white tinged with sulphur-yellow, the base and costal area pale rufous. The antemedial line is dark tinged with yellow, oblique to just below the cell, then erect. There is a dark annulus in the middle of the cell and a discoidal bar tinged with yellow and filled in with white. The postmedial line is dark tinged with yellow, excurved and waved between veins 5 and 2, then retracted to below the angle of the cell and angled outwards below the submedian fold. There is a similar faint line beyond it and a red-brown terminal line. The hindwings are white, the terminal area tinged with sulphur-yellow except at the tornus. There is a dark discoidal bar and the postmedial line is dark, bent outwards and waved between veins 5 and 2, then retracted to below the angle of the cell and erect to the inner margin. There is a faint waved brownish subterminal line and a red-brown terminal line.

References

Moths described in 1918
Lepidoptera of Mozambique
Moths of Sub-Saharan Africa
sulphureotincta
Taxa named by George Hampson
Endemic fauna of Mozambique